WCAB (590 AM) is a radio station broadcasting a Rock & Roll Oldies format, licensed to Rutherfordton, North Carolina, United States.  The station is currently owned by Isothermal Broadcasting Company. WCAB operates at 1,000 watts day and 228 watts night, both non-directional.

The station is an affiliate of the Atlanta Braves radio network, the largest radio affiliate network in Major League Baseball. The station also carries The Rush Limbaugh Show.

During the 1970s and ’80s, it played Top Forty hits. Ron Wood, Bob St. Thomas, Jiving Jock Tadlock, and The Flying Dutchman were some of the Famous and Leading DJs during that era.

References

External links
 

CAB